Franchère may refer to:

Persons with the surname 
 Gabriel Franchère (1786–1863), French Canadian fur trader, explorer and writer
 Joseph-Charles Franchère (1866–1921), a Canadian painter from Quebec
 Timothée Franchère (1866–1921), Canadian painter

Places 
Franchere, Alberta (sometimes Franchère), an unincorporated community in central Alberta, Canada
 Franchère Lake, a tributary of the Rivière aux Écorces du Milieu in Capitale-Nationale, Quebec, Canada
Franchère Peak, a summit in the Astoria River valley of Jasper National Park in the Canadian Rockies of Alberta, Canada